George Edward Schmees (September 6, 1924 – October 30, 1998) was an American professional baseball player. An outfielder, he appeared in Major League Baseball for the St. Louis Browns and Boston Red Sox during the  season. He was born in Cincinnati.
 
In a 76-game Major League career, Schmees was a .168 hitter (21-for-125) with 17 runs, six RBI, four doubles, and one triple without home runs. He made 52 fielding appearances at center field (20), right (19), left (9) and first base (4). He also pitched two games (one start) and posted a 3.00 ERA in 6.0 innings of work and did not have a decision.

Schmees died in San Jose, California, at the age of 74.

External links 
Baseball Reference
Retrosheet

1924 births
1998 deaths
Baseball players from Cincinnati
Boston Red Sox players
Fort Worth Cats players
Hollywood Stars players
Major League Baseball outfielders
Montreal Royals players
Nashville Vols players
Ogden Reds players
St. Louis Browns players
Salt Lake City Bees players
Seattle Rainiers players
Spokane Indians players
Tulsa Oilers (baseball) players